This is a list of people from New Mexico, which includes notable people who were either born or have lived for a significant period of time in the U.S. state of New Mexico or its predecessors, the Spanish and Mexican Nuevo México and the American New Mexico Territory. They are referred to by the demonym "New Mexican", and by the Spanish language demonym "Neomexicano" or "Neomejicano" (as well as the feminine "Neomexicana" or "Neomejicana").

Athletics

Kyle Altman (born 1986) - soccer player
Jason Anderson (born 1993) – born in Rio Rancho, New Mexico, Supercross racer
Ross Anderson (born 1971) – lives in Taos, record holder in speed skiing
Hank Baskett (born 1982) – born in Clovis, former NFL player
Notah Begay III (born 1972) – born in Albuquerque, golfer
Ray Birmingham (born 1955) – born in Hobbs, baseball coach
Alan Branch (born 1984) – born in Rio Rancho, NFL player
Alex Bregman (born 1994) – baseball player
Bill Bridges (1939–2015) – born in Hobbs, former NBA player
Brenda Burnside (born 1963) – born in Albuquerque, boxer
Shelia Burrell (born 1972) – born in Albuquerque, heptathlete; fourth place in 2004 Olympic Games
Edgar Castillo (born 1986) – born in Las Cruces, Liga MX
Jackie Chavez (born 1983) – born in Albuquerque, lives in Las Cruces, boxer
Carlos Condit (born 1984) – born in Albuquerque, UFC fighter
Ryan Cook (born 1983) – born in Albuquerque, NFL player
 Christian Cunningham (born 1997) – raised in Albuquerque, basketball player in the Israeli Basketball Premier League
John Dodson (born 1984) – born in Albuquerque, mixed martial artist
Michael Dunn (born 1985) – born in Farmington, MLB player
Doug Eddings (born 1968) – born in Las Cruces, MLB umpire
Arian Foster (born 1986) – born in Albuquerque, running back for the Miami Dolphins
Bob Foster (1938–2015) – born in Albuquerque, light-heavyweight boxing world champion
Jack Gardner (1910–2000) – college men's basketball coach
Mitch Garver (born 1991) – born in Albuquerque, baseball player
Frank "Bruiser Brody" Goodish (1946–1988) – professional wrestler
Aaron Graham (born 1973) – former NFL center
Fred Haney (1896–1977) – Major League Baseball manager
Pat Henry (born 1951) – collegiate track-and-field head coach
Holly Holm (born 1981) – born in Albuquerque, mixed martial artist
Damion James (born 1987) – born in Hobbs, player for the New Jersey Nets
Ralph Kiner (1922–2014) – Baseball Hall of Famer
Nancy Lopez (born 1957) – raised in Roswell, Hall of Fame golfer
Ronnie Lott (born 1959) – Pro Football Hall of Famer
Colt McCoy (born 1986) – born in Hobbs, quarterback for the Washington Redskins
Tommy McDonald (1934–2018) – Pro Football Hall of Fame wide receiver
Matt Moore (born 1989) – lived in Edgewood, MLB player
Steve Ontiveros (born 1961) – baseball player
Dorothy Page (1921–1989) – known as the "mother of the Iditarod Trail Sled Dog Race"
André Roberson (born 1991) – born in Las Cruces, professional basketball player
Trevor Rogers (born 1998) – born in Carlsbad, MLB player
Cody Ross (born 1980) – born in Carlsbad, MLB player
Diego Sanchez (born 1981) – born in Albuquerque, UFC fighter
Mike E. Smith (born 1965) – born in Roswell, Hall of Fame jockey
Tony Snell (born 1991) – professional basketball player
Vern Stephens (1920–1968) – born in McAlister, baseball player
Chuck Stevens (1918–2018) – born in Colfax County, baseball player
Blake Swihart (born 1992) – raised in Rio Rancho, MLB player
Johnny Tapia (1967–2012) – born in Albuquerque, boxer
Jeff Taylor (1960–2020) – raised in Hobbs, former NBA player
Jeffery Taylor (born 1989) – raised in Hobbs, player for the Charlotte Hornets
Al Unser (born 1939) – born in Albuquerque, race car driver
Al Unser Jr. (born 1962) – born in Albuquerque, race car driver
Bobby Unser (1934–2021) – lived in Albuquerque, race car driver
Brian Urlacher (born 1978) – grew up in Lovington, NFL player
Kathy Whitworth (born 1939) – lived in Jal, New Mexico where her family owned a hardware store, professional golfer

Architecture

John Gaw Meem (1894–1983) – architect known for his work reviving traditional New Mexican architecture
Mike Reynolds – architect, designer of Earthships

Art, literature, and journalism

Edward Abbey – novelist, graduated from the University of New Mexico 
Rudolfo Anaya – novelist
Richard Artschwager – painter, illustrator and sculptor
Jimmy Santiago Baca – poet and author
Oscar E. Berninghaus (1874–1952) – founding member of Taos Society of Artists
Ernest L. Blumenschein (1874–1960) – founding member of Taos Society of Artists
Fray Angelico Chavez – poet and painter
Linda Chavez (born 1947) – author, commentator, radio talk show host
E. Irving Couse (1866–1936) – founding member of Taos Society of Artists
Stanley Crawford (born 1937) – writer and farmer
W. Herbert Dunton (1878–1936) – founding member of Taos Society of Artists
Nicolai Fechin (1881–1955) – painter known for his portraits and works featuring Native Americans
Forrest Fenn – poet, scholar, artist and painter, author, historian, teacher, environmentalist
R. C. Gorman (1931–2005) – Navajo artist
Grant Hayunga (born 1970) – artist and musician
Tony Hillerman (1925–2008) – journalist, mystery writer, "Edgar" award winner, MWA Grand Master
Peter Hurd (1904–1984) – artist
Barbara Latham (1896–1989) – painter, printmaker, illustrator
D. H. Lawrence (1885–1930) – novelist, poet, playwright, essayist, literary critic and painter
Marjorie Herrera Lewis – author and journalist 
Albert Looking Elk (1888–1940) – Taos Pueblo painter
Mabel Dodge Luhan (1879–1962) – writer and patroness of Taos art colony
Albert Lujan (1892–1948) – Taos Pueblo painter
Charles Fletcher Lummis (1859–1928) – journalist and Indian activist, photographer
Agnes Martin (1912–2004) – abstract painter
George R. R. Martin (born 1948) – lives in Santa Fe, screenwriter and author of fantasy, horror, and science fiction, including Game of Thrones
Maria Martinez (1887–1980) – pottery artist, famous for her pioneering work in black on black pottery
Bill Mauldin (1921–2003) – editorial cartoonist, Pulitzer Prize, 1945 and 1958
Cormac McCarthy – author of No Country for Old Men, The Road, Pulitzer Prize winner
Michael McGarrity – novelist, former deputy sheriff of Santa Fe County
Juan Mirabal (1903–1970) – Taos Pueblo painter
N. Scott Momaday (1934) – Kiowa, Pulitzer Prize-winning author and visual artist
Agnes Morley Cleaveland (1874–1958) – writer, cattle rancher, women's basketball player
Howard Morgan – television weather forecaster
Dan Namingha – Hopi artist
Bruce Nauman – artist
Georgia O'Keeffe (1887–1986) – artist
Bert Geer Phillips (1868–1956) – founding member of Taos Society of Artists
Ernie Pyle (1900–1945) – war correspondent, Pulitzer Prize 1944
Joseph Rael (born 1935) – Native American ceremonial dancer, shaman, writer, and artist
Anita Rodriguez (born 1941) – artist and painter
Antonio Roybal – artist
Hib Sabin (born 1935) – sculptor
George I. Sánchez (1906–1972) – scholar and activist
Joseph Henry Sharp (1859–1953) – founding member of Taos Society of Artists
Lori "Pop Wea" Tanner (died 1966) – Taos Pueblo painter and potter
Anne Trujillo – television news anchor and reporter, KMGH (ABC) in Denver
Sabine Ulibarri (1919–2003) – poet and teacher
Alisa Valdes – New York Times and USA Today bestselling author, staff writer Boston Globe and Los Angeles Times, screenwriter and producer
Harold Joe Waldrum (1934–2003) – artist
Linda Wertheimer – Senior National Correspondent for NPR
Cody Willard – anchor for Fox Business Network and co-host of Fox Business Happy Hour
Jack Williamson – novelist, professor at Eastern New Mexico University

Business

Paul Allen (1953–2018) – founded Microsoft in Albuquerque
Jeff Bezos (born 1964) – founder of Amazon
 Mack C. Chase (born 1931) – oil and natural gas businessman, also the richest New Mexican
Bill Gates (born 1955) – founded Microsoft in Albuquerque
Maria Gertrudis "Tules" Barceló (c. 1800–1852) – entrepreneur and gambler
Conrad Hilton (1887–1979) – founder of Hilton Worldwide
Forrest Mims (born 1944) – founded Micro Instrumentation and Telemetry Systems in Albuquerque
Ed Roberts (1941–2010) – founded Micro Instrumentation and Telemetry Systems in Albuquerque

Crime

Billy the Kid (1859–1881) – outlaw
Jose Chavez y Chavez (1851–1924) – cowboy and outlaw
Francisco Martin Duran – attempted assassin of Bill Clinton
William Walters aka (William E. "Bronco Bill" Walters) (1869–1921) – outlaw

Film and theater

Aviva – actress, Superbad
Kathy Baker (born 1950) – actress, CBS's Picket Fences, Fox's Boston Public
Greg Baldwin (born 1960) – actor, Uncle Iroh on the Nickelodeon animated series Avatar: The Last Airbender
Bruce Cabot (1904–1972) – actor, King Kong, Dodge City, The War Wagon
Jan Clayton (1917–1983) – actress, star of films and TV series Lassie
Ronny Cox (born 1938) – actor, Deliverance, RoboCop
Jesse Tyler Ferguson (born 1975) – actor, ABC's Modern Family
Tony Genaro, actor – Anger Management, Phenomenon
Annabeth Gish (born 1971) – actress, Fox's The X-Files and Showtime's Brotherhood
Drew Goddard (born 1975) – screenwriter, producer
Jeremy Foley (born 1983) – actor, Nickelodeon's Caitlin's Way
Adrian Grenier (born 1976) – actor, HBO's Entourage
Anna Gunn (born 1968) – actress, HBO's Deadwood, AMC's Breaking Bad
William Hanna (1910–2001) – animator, director, producer, cartoon artist, and co-founder of Hanna-Barbera
Neil Patrick Harris (born 1973) – actor, How I Met Your Mother, Doogie Howser, M.D.
Alexa Havins (born 1980) – actress, BBC's Torchwood, ABC's All My Children and One Life to Live
Judy Herrera – actress
Dennis Hopper (1936–2010) – actor, filmmaker, photographer, and artist
Mike Judge (born 1962) – actor, animator, producer, and creator of King of the Hill and Beavis and Butthead
Minka Kelly (born 1980) – actress, Lee Daniels' The Butler, The Roommate
Val Kilmer (born 1959) – actor, Heat, Tombstone, Top Gun
Mae Marsh (1894–1968) – actress, Intolerance, Rebecca of Sunnybrook Farm
Benito Martinez (born 1971) – actor, FX's The Shield
Patrice Martinez (1963–2018) – actress, The Family Channel's Zorro
Demi Moore (born 1962) – actress, Ghost, Indecent Proposal, A Few Good Men
Freddie Prinze Jr. (born 1975) – actor, I Know What You Did Last Summer, She's All That
Steven Michael Quezada (born 1963) – actor, Breaking Bad
Tracy Reiner (born 1964) – actress, When Harry Met Sally..., A League of Their Own, Apollo 13
Jay Roach (born 1957) – director, producer, the Austin Powers films, Meet the Parents
Willow Shields (born 2000) – child actress, Hunger Games
Ron Shock (1942–2012) – comedian
Geno Silva (1948–2020) – actor, Scarface, The Lost World: Jurassic Park, Amistad
Madolyn Smith (born 1957) – actress, Urban Cowboy, Funny Farm
Austin St. John (born 1975) –  actor, Jason Lee Scott, the original Red Ranger, on Mighty Morphin Power Rangers
Kim Stanley (1925–2001) – actress, The Goddess, To Kill a Mockingbird
French Stewart (born 1964) – actor, 3rd Rock from the Sun
Slim Summerville (1894–1968) – actor
Heidi Swedberg (born 1966) – actress, Seinfeld
Raoul Trujillo (born 1955) – actor
Jeremy Ray Valdez (born 1980) – actor
Kristen Vigard (born 1963) – actress, Annie, Guiding Light, The Survivors
Nick Wechsler (born 1978) – actor, The WB's and UPN's Roswell

Fashion

Judith Baldwin – Miss New Mexico 1965, runner-up Miss USA 1965, actress
Tom Ford – grew up in Santa Fe, fashion designer and businessman
Onawa Lacy – Miss New Mexico USA 2006
Marissa Livingston – Miss New Mexico 2015
Arizona Muse – fashion model
Christina Olmi – Miss New Mexico 2008
Millicent Rogers (1902–1953) – socialite, fashion icon, and art collector
Mai Shanley – Miss USA 1984

Government

Toney Anaya (born 1941) – former governor
Jerry Apodaca (born 1934) – former governor
Clinton Presba Anderson (1895–1975) – former U.S. senator
Jeff Bingaman (born 1943) – former U.S. senator
Tomás Vélez Cachupín – 47th and 52nd Spanish Governor of New Mexico, judge, achieved peace between Spaniards and the Amerindian peoples of New Mexico
Dennis Chavez (1888–1962) – former U.S. senator
Cochise (1812–1874) – Chiricahua Apache chief
Colorow (1810–1888) – Ute chief
Bronson M. Cutting (1888–1935) – former U.S. senator
Pete Domenici (1932–2017) – former U.S. senator
Ed Foreman (born 1933) – former U.S. representative
Geronimo (1829–1909) – Chiricahua Apache chief
Thomas E. Horn (born 1946) – Trustee San Francisco War Memorial and Performing Arts Center, lawyer, publisher Bay Area Reporter
Dolores Huerta – civil rights activist
Gary Johnson (born 1953) – former governor; Libertarian presidential candidate, 2012 and 2016
Bruce King (1924–2009) – former governor
Timothy Kraft (born 1941) – campaign manager for U.S. President Jimmy Carter in 1980
Manuel Lujan (1928–2019) – former U.S. representative
Joseph Montoya (1915–1978) – former U.S. senator
Janet Napolitano (born 1957) – former governor of Arizona, former United States Secretary of Homeland Security, current president of University of California System
Steve Pearce (born 1947) – U.S. representative
Popé (ca. 1630 – ca. 1688) – leader of the Pueblo Revolt
William T. Redmond (born 1954) – former U.S. representative
Bill Richardson (born 1947) – Energy Secretary, Ambassador to the United Nations, former governor, first Hispanic candidate for the U.S. Presidency
Edward R. Roybal (1916–2005) – U.S. representative from California, member of the Los Angeles City Council
Joe Skeen (1927–2003) – former U.S. representative
Victorio (1825–1880) – Chiricahua Apache chief

Military

Carl Nelson Gorman (1907–1998) – U.S. Marine Corp soldier, Navajo code talker during World War II, as well as artist, and professor.
Pete Jimenez (1917–2006) – U.S. Army soldier in World War II

Music

Lorenzo Antonio (born 1969) – born in Albuquerque, Latin pop and Mexican pop singer
Antonia Apodaca (1923–2020) – born in Rociada, New Mexico and American folk music singer
Consuelo Luz Arostegui – lives in Angel Fire, Latino musician
Ryan Bingham (born 1981) – born in Hobbs, singer-songwriter
Zach Condon (born 1986) – born in Santa Fe, musician in Beirut
John Denver (1943–1997) – born in Roswell, singer-songwriter
Bradley Ellingboe (born 1958) – composer
Al Hurricane (1936–2017) – born in Dixon, singer-songwriter, dubbed "The Godfather" of New Mexico music
Al Hurricane Jr. (born 1959) – born in Albuquerque, singer-songwriter, dubbed "The Godson" of New Mexico music
Demi Lovato (born 1992) – born in Albuquerque, pop music singer-songwriter
James Mercer (born 1970) – singer, musician and leader of the Shins and Broken Bells
Robert Mirabal (born 1966) – Taos Pueblo musician
Jim Morrison (1943–1971) – lived in Albuquerque for several years during his childhood
Michael Martin Murphey (born 1945) – author of New Mexico's state ballad, "The Land of Enchantment"
Norman Petty (1927–1984) – musician, songwriter, record producer
Pascual Romero (born 1980) – musician, television producer
Sparx members – born in Albuquerque, Latin pop sisters Verónica, Rosamaria, Kristyna and Carolina Sanchez
James Tenney (1934–2006) – born in Silver City, composer
Kristen Vigard (born 1963) – lives in Taos, singer (Red Hot Chili Peppers, Fishbone)
Tony Vincent (born 1973) – born in Albuquerque, performer

Law enforcement

Elfego Baca (1865–1945) – gunman and lawman in the American frontier
Pat Garrett (1850–1908) – sheriff known for shooting Billy the Kid
Lonnie Zamora (1933–2009) – police officer who reported a famous UFO sighting outside Socorro in 1964

Religion

Cormac Antram (1926–2013) – Catholic priest, known for his work translating the Catholic mass into the Navajo language, last Franciscan priest who could speak Navajo fluently
Anton Docher (1852–1928) – missionary and defender of the Indians
Jeff King – Navajo hataałii (medicine man)

Science and technology

Adolph Francis Alphonse Bandelier (1840–1914) – archaeologist after whom Bandelier National Monument and Bandelier Elementary School (in Albuquerque) in New Mexico is named
Edward Condon (1902–1974) – nuclear physicist
Robert H. Goddard (1882–1945) – built the world's first liquid-fueled rocket
Sidney M. Gutierrez (born 1951) – astronaut
Jaron Lanier (born 1960) – computer scientist
Edgar Mitchell (1930—2016) – aeronautical engineer, NASA astronaut
Harrison Schmitt (born 1935) – astronaut, geologist and former U.S. Senator from New Mexico
Mark Spencer – computer engineer
John Stapp – pioneer in studying the effects of acceleration and deceleration forces on humans, "the fastest man on earth"
Clyde Tombaugh – astronomer and discoverer of the celestial body Pluto (at the time considered to be the 9th planet in the solar system) 
Lydia Villa-Komaroff – molecular and cellular biologist
Michael Wartell – chancellor of Indiana University – Purdue University Fort Wayne
Annie Dodge Wauneka (1895–1997) – Navajo health educator, winner of Presidential Medal of Freedom

See also

 List of New Mexico State University people
 List of people from Albuquerque
 List of New Mexico suffragists
 List of St. John's College (Annapolis/Santa Fe) people
 List of University of New Mexico alumni
 List of University of New Mexico faculty
 List of University of New Mexico presidents
 Lists of Americans